Larissa Sirah Herden (born 20 June 1986), known professionally as Lary, is a German singer.

Career 
In 2014 she dropped her debut album FutureDeutscheWelle — that's how she describes the type of her music — with the singles System, Sirenen, Jung & Schön, Kryptonit, Propeller and Bedtime Blues. One year later, in 2015 she was featured on German rapper MoTrips hit single So wie du bist, which was certified platinum in Germany. In 2017 she released the single Lieblingssongs along with German rapper and singer Olson.

On 4 May 2018, Lary released the song Das neue Schwarz as the first single of her second studioalbum Hart fragil, which was released on 20 July 2018. The second single Mond was released on 1 June 2018.

Discography

Albums

Singles

References 

1986 births
Living people
People from Gelsenkirchen
21st-century German  women  singers